Patrick Morocutti (born 19 February 1968) is a retired Luxembourgian football striker. He became Luxembourg National Division top goalscorer in 1987–88 and 1990–91.

References

1968 births
Living people
Luxembourgian footballers
Union Luxembourg players
Jeunesse Esch players
Association football forwards
Luxembourg international footballers